The 1916 Yale Bulldogs football team represented Yale University in the 1916 college football season. The Bulldogs finished with an 8–1 record under first-year head coach Tad Jones. The team outscored its opponents by a combined score of 182 to 44 and suffered its only loss to Brown. Yale guard Clinton Black was a consensus pick for the 1916 College Football All-America Team, and four other Yale players (ends Charles Comerford and George Moseley, halfback Harry LeGore, and a guard with the surname Fox) also received first-team All-American honors from at least one selector in 1916.

Schedule

References

Yale
Yale Bulldogs football seasons
Yale Bulldogs football